Sarah Thompson Kane (born October 25, 1979) is an American actress. She is known for her roles as Eve in Angel (2003–2004) and as Rose in 7th Heaven (2005–2006).

Biography
Thompson Kane has also appeared in several films, including Cruel Intentions 2, Malibu's Most Wanted, Dear Me, Brutal, Broken Windows, Hansie, A Christmas Proposal, Taking Chance, Brooklyn's Finest, Break, The Pink Conspiracy and Raajneeti, a Bollywood movie.

She married Brad Kane on July 28, 2007; together they have two daughters.

Filmography

Film

Television

References

External links
Sarah Thompson's MySpace page

1979 births
Living people
Actresses from Los Angeles
Actresses from Pasadena, California
American film actresses
American television actresses
Barnard College alumni
American expatriate actresses in India
Actresses in Hindi cinema
20th-century American actresses
21st-century American actresses